The Man in the Brown Suit is a television movie adaptation of an Agatha Christie mystery novel of the same name about an American woman getting involved in a diamond theft in South Africa.

Plot
A tourist visiting Cairo witnesses a murder and after that sees a man in a brown suit fleeing the scene. She boards a ship and assumes that one of her fellow passengers is the criminal and that they also plan to steal a cache of diamonds. However, all of her traveling companies appear to be potential suspects.

Cast
Stephanie Zimbalist as Anne BeddingField
Rue McClanahan as Suzy Blair
Tony Randall as Rev. Edward Chichester
Edward Woodward as Sir Eustace Pedlar
Ken Howard as Gordon Race 
Nickolas Grace as Guy Underhill
Simon Dutton as Harry Lucas 
Maria Casal as Anita
Federicio Luciano as Leo Carton
Rose McVeigh as Valerie
Jorge Bosso as the Businessman
Jose Canalejas as Arab #1
Robert Case as the Ship's captain
Tibi Costa as Arab #2
James Duggan as steward

References

External links 
 

1989 films
Films based on works by Agatha Christie
1980s English-language films